Corcelles is the name or part of the name of several places:

Switzerland
 Corcelles, Bern, in the canton of Bern
 Corcelles-Cormondrèche, in the canton of Neuchâtel 
 Corcelles-le-Jorat, in the canton of Vaud
 Corcelles-près-Concise, in the canton of Vaud
 Corcelles-près-Payerne, in the canton of Vaud
 Corcelles-sur-Chavornay, in the canton of Vaud

France
 Corcelles, Ain, in the Ain département
 Corcelles-en-Beaujolais, in the Rhône département 
 Corcelles-Ferrières, in the Doubs département 
 Corcelles-les-Arts, in the Côte-d'Or département 
 Corcelles-lès-Cîteaux, in the Côte-d'Or département 
 Corcelles-les-Monts, in the Côte-d'Or département